Johnny Patrick (born August 17, 1988) is a former American football cornerback. He was drafted by the New Orleans Saints in the third round of the 2011 NFL Draft. He played college football at Louisville.

Early life
Patrick was born in DeLand, Florida and attended DeLand High School.

College career
Patrick played college football for the Louisville Cardinals from 2007–2010. He was the starting cornerback from 2008 to 2010. In 2009 Patrick recorded 53 tackles and two interceptions. In the 2010 Beef 'O' Brady's Bowl, Patrick forced a fumble and blocked a field goal to help the Cardinals win against Southern Miss.

Professional career

Pre-draft
Patrick was projected to be a second-third round pick in the 2011 NFL Draft.

New Orleans Saints
Patrick was selected by the New Orleans Saints in the third round (88th overall) of the 2011 NFL Draft. He was cut by the Saints on February 19, 2013.

San Diego Chargers
Patrick was signed by the San Diego Chargers on February 20, 2013.
He eventually played in 13 games, playing the nickel and slot, while starting 4. He set career highs with 38 total tackles, 1 interception, 1.5 sack, along with a forced fumble and 2 passes defended. He was released on March 4, 2014.

New York Jets
Patrick was acquired off waivers by the New York Jets on March 5, 2014. He was released on August 30, 2014.

Winnipeg Blue Bombers
On March 22, 2016, the Winnipeg Blue Bombers of the Canadian Football League signed Patrick to a contract. He was released before the start of the season on June 15, 2016.

References

External links

Louisville Cardinals football bio
San Diego Chargers bio

1988 births
Living people
People from DeLand, Florida
Players of American football from Florida
American football cornerbacks
Louisville Cardinals football players
New Orleans Saints players
San Diego Chargers players
Sportspeople from Volusia County, Florida
New York Jets players
Winnipeg Blue Bombers players